The Union Chain Bridge or Union Bridge is a suspension bridge that spans the River Tweed between Horncliffe, Northumberland, England and Fishwick, Berwickshire, Scotland. Although work started on the Menai Suspension Bridge first, the Union Bridge was completed earlier. Today it is the oldest suspension bridge still carrying road traffic and is a Category A listed building in Scotland, a Grade I listed building in England and an International Historic Civil Engineering Landmark. It lies on Sustrans Route 1 and the Pennine Cycleway.

History

Before the opening of the Union Bridge, crossing the river at this point involved an  round trip via Berwick downstream or a  trip via Coldstream upstream. (Ladykirk and Norham Bridge did not open until 1888.) The Tweed was forded in the vicinity of the bridge site, but the route was impassable during periods of high water. The Berwick and North Durham Turnpike Trust took on responsibility for improving matters by issuing a specification for a bridge.

Construction
The bridge was designed by an English Royal Navy officer, Captain Samuel Brown. Brown joined the Navy in 1795, and seeing the need for an improvement on the hemp ropes used, which frequently failed with resulting loss to shipping, he employed blacksmiths to create experimental wrought iron chains.  was fitted with iron rigging in 1806, and in a test voyage proved successful enough that in 1808, with his cousin Samuel Lenox, he set up a company that would become Brown Lenox & Co. Brown left the Navy in 1812, and in 1813 he built a prototype suspension bridge of  span, using  of iron. It was sufficiently strong to support a carriage, and John Rennie and Thomas Telford reported favourably upon it.

Brown took out a patent in 1816 for a method of manufacturing chains, followed by a patent titled Construction of a Bridge by the Formation and Uniting of its Component Parts in July 1817. In around 1817, Brown proposed a  span bridge over the River Mersey at Runcorn, but this bridge was not built. It is not known why Brown became involved with the Union Bridge project, but agreed to take on the work based on a specification dated September 1818.

Brown knew little of masonry, and Rennie did this aspect of the work.

The bridge proposal received consent in July 1819, with the authority of an Act of Parliament that had been passed in 1802, and construction began on 2 August 1819.

It opened on 26 July 1820, with an opening ceremony attended by the celebrated Scottish civil engineer Robert Stevenson among others. Captain Brown tested the bridge in a curricle towing twelve carts, before a crowd of about 700 spectators crossed. Until 1885, tolls were charged for crossing the bridge; the toll cottage, at the English end, was demolished in 1955.

Later history
With the abolition of turnpike tolls in 1883, maintenance of the bridge passed to the Tweed Bridges Trust. When the Trust was wound up the bridge became the responsibility of Scottish Borders Council and Northumberland County Council and is now maintained by the latter.

In addition to the 1902 addition of cables, the bridge has been strengthened and refurbished on many occasions. The bridge deck was substantially renewed in 1871, and again in 1974, with the chains reinforced at intervals throughout its life.

The bridge was closed to motor vehicles for several months during 2007 due to one of the bridge hangers breaking. In December 2008 the bridge was closed to traffic as a result of a landslide.

In March 2013 there was a proposal to close the bridge because of a lack of funds to maintain it. In 2013, the bridge was placed on Historic England's Heritage at Risk register. In October 2014, local enthusiasts and activists started a campaign to have the bridge fully restored in time for its bicentenary in 2020.

Restoration project
In March 2017 Scottish Borders Council and Northumberland County Council agreed to contribute £550,000 each towards a restoration project that was then expected to cost £5 million. Between then and August 2020 further pledges were made by both councils, the National Lottery Heritage Fund and Historic England. The work started in October 2020 and was expected to cost £10.5 million and take around 18 months. The chains were cut in March 2021 and the restored bridge was due to re-open in early 2022. In August 2022, the bridge was reported as being "almost complete".

Design

It runs on an east–west alignment, with the western end in Scotland and the eastern end in England. At the Scottish end the road continues straight, but at the English end it turns sharply south.

References

External links
The website of the Union Chain Bridge: Crossing Borders, Inspiring Communities project.
 The website of the Friends of the Union Chain Bridge.
 Film voerage and bridge history

Suspension bridges in the United Kingdom
Bridges in the Scottish Borders
Bridges across the River Tweed
Chain bridges
Grade I listed bridges
Bridges completed in 1820
History of Northumberland
Berwickshire
Scheduled monuments in Northumberland
Berwick Upon Tweed, Union
Category A listed buildings in the Scottish Borders
Listed bridges in Scotland
Historic Civil Engineering Landmarks
Anglo-Scottish border
Former toll bridges in England
Former toll bridges in Scotland
1820 establishments in England
1820 establishments in Scotland